The greater sciatic foramen is an opening (foramen) in the posterior human pelvis. It is formed by the sacrotuberous and sacrospinous ligaments. The piriformis muscle passes through the foramen and occupies most of its volume. The greater sciatic foramen is wider in women than in men.

Structure
It is bounded as follows:
 anterolaterally by the greater sciatic notch of the ilium.
 posteromedially by the sacrotuberous ligament.
 inferiorly by the sacrospinous ligament and the ischial spine.
 superiorly by the anterior sacroiliac ligament.

Function
The piriformis, which exits the pelvis through the foramen, occupies most of its volume.

The following structures also exit the pelvis through the greater sciatic foramen:

See also

Lesser sciatic foramen

References

External links
 
 

Anatomy
Bones of the pelvis